The 1997 WPF Drafts are a pair of player drafts held as part of the launch of the inaugural season of Women's Pro Fastpitch softball league.  The first, the 1996 WPF Amateur Draft, a draft of 120 softball players, was held in Minneapolis, MN Oct. 8, 1996. 
The second, the 1997 WPF Senior Draft, a draft of 60 college seniors divided among the WPF's six teams, was held March 20, 1997.

NewsOK.com reported on a 1995 WPF draft. It is unclear if the date is incorrect, or if the results of this draft had any relationship with the 1996 and 1997 drafts mentioned above, or if the draft was disregarded entirely.  NewsOK reported that Olympians Michele Smith and Lisa Fernandez were drafted. NewsOK also listed draftees  pitchers Kim Ward (sixth round), Dena Carter (10th round) and Amy Day (11th round) and  outfielder Becky Burroughs (13th round).

The tables below for the drafts are incomplete, but will be filled out as further research is completed.

The following players were reported as drafted, but the exact round and pick number unclear:
 Draftees Gena Weber and twin sisters Karla Kunnen-Wojtas and Kari Kunnen-Kossen reported to play for the Roadsters after the 1997 NCAA season finished.
 Marty Laudato was selected in the 16th round of the WPF draft in October. 
 Molly Lackman, formerly of Immaculata, was picked two rounds two rounds after Laudato.

Following are some of the selections from the 1997 WPF drafts:
Position key: 
C = catcher; INF = infielder; SS = shortstop; OF = outfielder; UT = Utility infielder; P = pitcher; RHP = right-handed pitcher; LHP = left-handed pitcher
Positions will be listed as combined for those who can play multiple positions.

1996 WPF Amateur Draft

Round 1

Round 2

Round 3

Round 4

Round 5

Round 6

Round 7

Round 8

Round 9

Round 10

Round 11

Round 12

Round 13

Round 14

Round 15

Round 16

Round 17

Round 18

Round 19

Round 20

Round 21

1997 WPF Senior Draft

Round 1

Round 2

Round 3

Round 4

Round 5

Round 6

Round 7

Round 8

Round 9

Round 10

Draft notes

References 

 1997 in softball